Patrick Bolger (born 31 January 1948) is a Canadian former wrestler and judoka who competed in the 1968 Summer Olympics and in the 1972 Summer Olympics.

References

See also
Judo in Canada

1948 births
Living people
Canadian male judoka
Olympic wrestlers of Canada
Wrestlers at the 1968 Summer Olympics
Wrestlers at the 1972 Summer Olympics
Wrestlers at the 1970 British Commonwealth Games
Canadian male sport wrestlers
Commonwealth Games medallists in wrestling
Commonwealth Games silver medallists for Canada
Pan American Games medalists in judo
Pan American Games medalists in wrestling
Pan American Games silver medalists for Canada
Pan American Games bronze medalists for Canada
Wrestlers at the 1971 Pan American Games
Medalists at the 1971 Pan American Games
20th-century Canadian people
21st-century Canadian people
Medallists at the 1970 British Commonwealth Games